Moises Bicentini (27 December 1931 – 25 April 2007) was an association football player from Curaçao who played in the Netherlands for NEC between 1957 and 1961. His son was fellow player Remko Bicentini.

External links
  Player profile at NEC Fan

1931 births
2007 deaths
Curaçao footballers
Dutch Antillean footballers
NEC Nijmegen players
Netherlands Antilles international footballers
People from Willemstad
Association football midfielders
Sport Unie Brion Trappers players